The Whittier Terminal Depot is an Alaska Railroad halt in Whittier, Alaska. Although the railroad does not have an official station in Whittier, Glacier Discovery trains stop at this point across the street from the cruise-ship terminal in the town.

References

External links
Station on Google Maps Street View

Alaska Railroad stations
Buildings and structures in Chugach Census Area, Alaska